Bernard Joseph McFadden  (March 20, 1877 – April 28, 1924) was a Major League Baseball pitcher for the 1901 Cincinnati Reds and 1902 Philadelphia Phillies. He went to Villanova University.

External links

1877 births
1924 deaths
Major League Baseball pitchers
Baseball players from Pennsylvania
Cincinnati Reds players
Philadelphia Phillies players
St. Joseph Saints players